The 10th Tactical Wing is a wing in the Air Component of the Belgian Armed Forces. It is based at the Kleine Brogel Air Base, in the municipality of Peer. It employs approximately 38 F-16 Fighting Falcons and 1700 staff.

It is organised into three groups, the Flying Group, the Maintenance Group and the Defence and Support Group, and is supported by a medical detachment, a territorial maintenance team and the 701st Munitions Support Squadron, 52d Fighter Wing, United States Air Force. The 701st Munitions Support Squadron maintains U.S. tactical nuclear weapons for use by Belgian aircraft in wartime under the NATO Nuclear sharing policy. The Flying Group comprises the 31st Squadron, the 349th Squadron and an Operational Conversion Unit.

External links 
Section of the website of the Belgian Ministry of Defence about the 10th Tactical Wing
 WWW.10WTAC.BE Website about the insignia of the 10th Tactical Wing

Tactical Wing, 10
Military units and formations established in 1951
1951 establishments in Belgium